Delta Kappa Epsilon Fraternity House may refer to:

Delta Kappa Epsilon Fraternity House (Champaign, Illinois), listed on the U.S. National Register of Historic Places (NRHP)
Delta Kappa Epsilon Fraternity House (Greencastle, Indiana), listed on the NRHP
Deke House (Ithaca, New York), listed on the NRHP